Vila is a common Spanish and Portuguese surname in Catalan, Galician, Occitan and Portuguese that means 'village' or 'farm'. Other spelling: Villa, Villar, Vilar, Vilares, Villares, Villalta, Villalba. 

 Begoña Vila (born 1963), Spanish astrophysicist
 Bob Vila (born 1946), American home improvement television show host
 Enrique Vila-Matas, Spanish writer
 Hèctor Vila, pseudonym of Pere Vilaregut, Spanish singer
 Ferran Vila Bonell (b. 1983), Andorran ski mountaineer
 Florian Vila, Albanian chess master
 Jaume Vila Mulet, Spanish politician
 Joan Vila i Cinca, Spanish painter
 Joan Vila i Pujol, Spanish drafter and illustrator, known as D'Ivori
 Joe Vila (1866–1934), American sports writer
 Jordi Vila i Foruny, Spanish industrialist and politician
 Josep Vila i Amorós, Spanish musician
 Josep Vila Closes, Spanish painter
 Lluís Vila i d'Abadal, Spanish doctor and politician
 Lucas Vila, Argentine field hockey player
 Maria Vila i Panadès, Spanish actress
 Matías Vila, Argentine field hockey player
 Montserrat Vilà (born 1964), Spanish ecologist
 Patxi Vila, Spanish road bicycle racer
 Pere Alberch Vila, Spanish Renaissance composer and organist
 Ramon Vila i Capdevila, Spanish anarcho-syndicalist and maquis, better known as Cara cremada (Burned face)
 Rodrigo Vila, Argentine field hockey player
 Rosalía Vila (born 1993), Spanish singer
 Santiago Vila i Vicente, Spanish historian and politician
 Waldo Vila Gilabert, Spanish pilota player

Catalan-language surnames
Galician-language surnames
Occitan-language surnames
Portuguese-language surnames